Accelerator nerve are cardiopulmonary splanchnic nerves that allows the sympathetic nervous system's stimulation of the heart. They originate from the ganglion cells of the superior, middle, and inferior cervical ganglion of the sympathetic trunk. The accelerator nerves increases the heart rate. It causes the heart to beat with more force, which then increases blood pressure.

While accelerator nerves increases the heart rate which then increase blood pressure, accelerans nerve speeds it up by emitting noradrenaline. This results in an increased bloodflow.

Accelerator nerves also play an important role in controlling heart rate in birds.

References 

Sympathetic nervous system